Burj Qallawiyah    is a village in the  Bint Jbeil District in southern Lebanon.

Name
According to E. H. Palmer, the name Burj el Alawei means  "the tower of the Alawei".

History
In 1881, the PEF's Survey of Western Palestine (SWP)  described Burj Alawei as: “A village, built of stone, containing about 300 Metawileh, situated on upland, with a few olives, figs, and some arable land round. The water supply is from a well and spring.”

References

Bibliography

External links
 Borj Qalaouiyeh, Localiban
Survey of Western Palestine, Map 2:   IAA, Wikimedia commons
 

Populated places in Bint Jbeil District
Shia Muslim communities in Lebanon